Pomysk may refer to the following places in Poland:

Pomysk Mały
Pomysk Wielki